Stanisław Leśniewski (30 March 1886 – 13 May 1939) was a Polish mathematician, philosopher and logician.

Life
He was born on 28 March 1886 at Serpukhov, near Moscow, to father Izydor, an engineer working on the construction of the Trans-Siberian Railway, and mother Helena (née Palczewska). Leśniewski went to a high school in Irkutsk. Later he attended lectures by Hans Cornelius at the Ludwig Maximilian University of Munich and lectures by Wacław Sierpiński at Lviv University.

Leśniewski belonged to the first generation of the Lwów–Warsaw School of logic founded by Kazimierz Twardowski. Together with Alfred Tarski and  Jan Łukasiewicz, he formed a trio which made the University of Warsaw, during the interbellum, perhaps the most important research center in the world for formal logic.

His main contribution was the construction of three nested formal systems, to which he gave the Greek-derived names of protothetic, ontology, and mereology. ("Calculus of names" is sometimes used instead of ontology, a term widely employed in metaphysics in a very different sense.) A good textbook presentation of these systems is that by Simons (1987), who compares and contrasts them with the variants of mereology, more popular nowadays, descending from the calculus of individuals of Leonard and Goodman. Simons clarifies something that is very difficult to determine by reading Leśniewski and his students, namely that Polish mereology is a first-order theory isomorphic to what is now called classical extensional mereology.

While he did publish a fair body of work (Leśniewski, 1992, is his collected works in English translation), some of it in German, the leading language for mathematics of his day, his writings had limited impact because of their enigmatic style and highly idiosyncratic notation. Leśniewski was also a radical nominalist: he rejected axiomatic set theory at a time when that theory was in full flower. He pointed to Russell's paradox and the like in support of his rejection, and devised his three formal systems as a concrete alternative to set theory. Even though Alfred Tarski was his sole doctoral pupil, Leśniewski nevertheless strongly influenced an entire generation of Polish logicians and mathematicians via his teaching at the University of Warsaw. It is mainly thanks to the writings of his students (e.g., Srzednicki and Rickey 1984) that Leśniewski's thought is known.

During the Polish–Soviet War of 1919-21, Leśniewski served the cause of Poland's independence by breaking Soviet Russian ciphers for the Polish General Staff's Cipher Bureau.

Leśniewski died suddenly of cancer, shortly before the German invasion of Poland, which resulted in the destruction of his Nachlass. He was buried at Warsaw's Powązki Cemetery.

Works
 1988. Lecture Notes in Logic. Kluwer. Table of Contents.
 1992. Collected Works. 2 vols. Kluwer. Table of Contents.
 1929, "Über Funktionen, deren Felder Gruppen mit Rücksicht auf diese Funktionen sind", Fundamenta Mathematicae 13: 319-32.
 1929, "Grundzüge eines neuen Systems der Grundlagen der Mathematik", Fundamenta Mathematicae 14: 1-81.
 1929, "Über Funktionen, deren Felder Abelsche Gruppen in bezug auf diese Funktionen sind", Fundamenta Mathematicae 14: 242-51.

See also
 History of philosophy in Poland
 List of Poles

References

 Ivor Grattan-Guinness, 2000. In Search of Mathematical Roots. Princeton: Princeton University Press.
 Luschei, Eugene, 1962. The Logical Systems of Lesniewski. Amsterdam: North-Holland.
 Miéville, Denis, 1984. "Un Développement des Systèmes Logiques de Stanislas Lesniewski", Peter Lang, European University Studies.
 Simons, Peter, 1987. Parts: A Study in Ontology. New York: Oxford University Press.
 Srzednicki, J. T. J., and Rickey, V. F., (eds.), 1984. Lesniewski's Systems: Ontology and Mereology. Dordrecht: Kluwer.
 Surma, Stanislaw J. (editor) (1977/8) "On Leśniewski's Systems, Proceedings of XXII Conference on History of Logic", Studia Logica 36(4): 247–426 
 Urbaniak, Rafal, 2013. Leśniewski's Systems of Logic and Foundations of Mathematics, Dordrecht: Springer.
 Wolenski, Jan, 1989. Logic and Philosophy in the Lwow-Warsaw School. Dordrecht: Kluwer.

External links

 Betti, Arianna, 2001, "Sempiternal Truth: The Bolzano-Twardowski-Lesniewski connection."
Polish Philosophy: Stanislaw Lesniewski by Francesco Coniglione and Arianna Betti.
 Raul Corazzon's Theory and History of Ontology web page: Lesniewski. 
 Selected bibliography of and about Lesniewski. Includes the English translations and selected bibliography of the secondary literature.

1886 births
1939 deaths
20th-century Polish philosophers
People from Serpukhov
Polish logicians
Polish mathematicians
Cipher Bureau (Poland)
University of Warsaw alumni
Deaths from cancer in Poland